In Thrall to the Claw is a 1921 Austrian silent film directed by Carl Froelich and starring Eugen Jensen, Gustav Diessl, and Julius Strobl. While visiting the set, future director Georg Wilhelm Pabst made his only ever screen appearance as an actor.

The film's sets were designed by the art director Jacek Rotmil.

Cast

References

Bibliography

External links

1921 films
Austrian silent feature films
Films directed by Carl Froelich
Austrian black-and-white films